Ambri Airport (:ICAO: LSPM) is a Swiss general aviation airport. It located near the village of Ambrì, in the municipality of Quinto, canton of Ticino. Ambri serves the surrounding area and is home to a gliding school, a helicopter base and has sufficiency for VFR flying.

The airport is situated in the steep-sided alpine valley of the Ticino river. It is flanked to the north by the A2 motorway and the river, and to the south by the Gotthard railway and the villages of Ambri and Piotta.

History 

Ambri Airport began as a :Swiss Air Force base, built during World War II. It was home to the Fighter Squadron 8, whose fleet included the :EKW C-35, :Messerschmitt Bf 109, :de Havilland Vampire, :de Havilland Venom and the :Hawker Hunter.

The mountains surrounding the airport housed bunkers of which were home to tactical buildings, fighter aircraft and troops. The bunkers were accessed by taxiways that passed under the A2 motorway, and over the Ticino river.

In 1994 the Swiss Air Force base was deactivated, and the airfield converted into a civilian airport. The Aircraft cavern that formerly accommodated the base still exists but are now empty.

See also
Military significance of Switzerlands Motorways
Aircraft cavern

References

Notes

External links 
 
 Official Website 
  DH-112 Venom Take-off & landing at Ambri

Airports in Ticino